EDGE Group is a United Arab Emirates (UAE) state-owned conglomeration of 25 companies to provide military weaponry and related technologies. It is headquartered in the UAE.

History 
On 5 November 2019, the EDGE group was established and consisted of more than 25 entities from Emirates Defence Industries Company (EDIC), Emirates Advanced Investments Group (EAIG), Tawazun Holding, and other independent organisations to address the UAE's antiquated military industry. The company has approximately 6,000 employees working across its four core clusters: Platforms & Systems, Weapons & Missiles, Electronic Warfare & Cyber Technologies, and Trading & Mission Support.

At Dubai Airshow 2019, EDGE was the official Advanced Technology Partner. EDGE Group's 11 participating entities showcased their range of capabilities which included unmanned aerial vehicles, long-range munitions including the UAE-made ADASI RW-24. AMMROC also announced its plan to open a maintenance facility connected to Al Ain International Airport.

EDGE's entity HALCON signed a US$1 billion contract in November 2019 to deliver its Desert Sting lightweight precision guided missiles to UAE Armed Forces.

Later, GAL, which was part of the Mission Support Cluster within EDGE Group, signed a contract with Kenya’s Ministry of Defence to provide MRO services to the Kenyan Air Force. GAL also signed an AED 3.5 billion support contract with the UAE’s Joint Aviation Command.

EDGE joined Tawdheef, the UAE’s leading event for Emiratisation, and the second edition of the biennial Mohamed bin Zayed International Robotics Challenge 2020 (MBZIRC 2020), as the official Advanced Technology Partner in January 2020.

EDGE’s ADASI also launched its VTOL made in UAE drone at UMEX in February 2020.

In 2017, the CG Haenel group, under EDGE, bid to acquire the contract to supply 120,000 assault rifles to Germany’s Bundeswehr, against Heckler & Koch. In September 2020, the Defense Ministry of Germany announced that CG Haenel secured the contract of $250 million. However, in early October 2020, the award was lifted by the Defense Ministry, due to patent infringement and risk to the taxpayers’ money.

In December 2020 SIPRI reported EDGE ranked 22nd in the world's largest arms companies list. According to Pieter Wezeman, Senior Researcher with the SIPRI Arms and Military Expenditure Programme "EDGE is a good illustration of how the combination of high national demand for military products and services with a desire to become less dependent on foreign suppliers is driving the growth of arms companies in the Middle East." The sales of arms and military services by the largest 25 companies totaled US$361 billion in 2019, with EDGE accounting for 1.3 percent of this total arms sales. According to DefenseNews.com 2021 July report EDGE group is the 24th largest defense contractor.

Subsidiaries 
The groups subsidiaries are classified under four categories.
 Platforms and Systems
 ADASI develops autonomous systems such as unmanned aircraft and drones
 ADSB (Abu Dhabi Ship Building) builds and repairs naval and commercial vessels in their shipyards and work with the UAE navy
 AL JASOOR supplies an amphibious armoured vehicle
 AL TAIF provides maintenance and repair services for military ground vehicles
 NIMR manufactures armoured vehicles
 EPI is a precision engineering manufacturer for components used in small arms, aerospace, oil and gas industries
 Missiles and Weapons
 AL TARIQ converts aerial weapons into long range guided weapons
 APT manufactures low velocity projectiles and smoke grenades
 CARACAL manufactures small arms
 HALCON manufactures guides missile systems
 LAHAB manufactures munitions and provides training and testing
 Electronic Warfare and Cyber Technologies
BEACON RED provides security training
 SIGN4L develops electronic and cyber warfare training
Trading and Mission Support
HORIZON provides helicopter training
JAHEZIYA provides emergency response training and certification
REMAYA provides shooting ranges and related training and management services

Awards 
On 24 November 2022, EDGE Group was awarded the prestigious ROI-EFESO INDUSTRIE 4.0 Award 2022 in Munich, Germany, in the ‘SMART WORKFORCE’ category for Best Implementation of Industry 4.0 solutions in 2022. ROI-EFESO Management Consulting AG awards the coveted accolade annually to companies that implement forward-looking and successful pioneering solutions in the areas of Smart Factory, Smart Production, Smart Products & Services, and Smart Supply Chain Management. 

 EDGE, one of four global winners, was awarded for its agile, and systematic implementation of multiple Industry 4.0 solutions in 2022.

 EDGE’s Industry 4.0 ambitious roadmap, fast implementation of 30 projects in 18 months, and its exhaustive upskilling of workforce at the EDGE Learning & Innovation Factory, demonstrate EDGE Industry 4.0 ambitions to become a global lighthouse of modern digitisation.

References 

Manufacturing companies based in Abu Dhabi
Defence companies of the United Arab Emirates
Government-owned companies of the United Arab Emirates
Holding companies of the United Arab Emirates
Emirati companies established in 2019
Conglomerate companies established in 2019